Philydrella pygmaea  is a plant species in the Philydraceae family, first described by Robert Brown in 1810 as Philydrum pygmaeum, and transferred to the genus, Philydrella in 1878 by Teodoro Caruel.

It is endemic to the south-west of Western Australia.

References

Flora of Western Australia
Philydraceae
Taxa named by Teodoro Caruel